St. Vincent Pallotti High School, usually called Pallotti, is a private Catholic school in eastern Laurel, Maryland. It was founded by the Pallottines in 1921 and is within the Archdiocese of Washington.

Pallotti is a co-ed school serving young men and women from Prince George's County, Howard County, Anne Arundel County, and Montgomery County. The school is currently attended by approximately 500 students.

The school is noted for its MIAA Varsity Boys Lacrosse Championship victory over The Park School at Johns Hopkins in 2006 and its Varsity Girls Soccer IAAM "A" conference championship victory in 2007. The Varsity Girls Swim Team has most recently won the IAAM C conference championship for two consecutive school years (2014–2015 and 2015–2016). Pallotti is home to the 2014 Maryland Interscholastic Athletic Association C Conference Football Champions and the 2016 MIAA B conference football champions. The basketball team won the B conference championship in 2014  and is currently looking to rise in the A conference. The wrestling team became back-to-back champions in the B conference for the 2013–2014 and 2014–2015 school years. The 2016 girls cross country team finished as runners-up in the C conference. The 2016 girls soccer team finished as IAAM C conference finalists, as well as the boys JV team.

School history
On July 9, 1911, Father Joseph A. Myer came to St. Mary of the Mills parish in Laurel. In 1913, he started a parochial school for the children of the parish, and asked the Sisters of Mercy to staff it. Father Myer purchased a colonial mansion known as the Tiffany Estate in October 1917. The mansion, which was the home of the manager of the Laurel Mills, was located just west of a public high school, now the Laurel Boys and Girls Club. A remnant of the original circular driveway can still be seen. The mansion was modified by the addition of a frame wing to the south side of the main structure, in order to accommodate a convent, school and boarding rooms for girls. The school drew pupils from a wide geographic area. In 1920 Father Myer purchased additional land close to the Academy with the intention of opening a high school in September 1921. He applied for additional Sisters of Mercy, but they were unable to supply the desired number of teachers. Thus, the Sisters of Mercy withdrew from Laurel in 1921. The Sisters of St. Joseph of Chestnut Hill Pennsylvania staffed the elementary and high school from 1921 to 1934.

In 1934, under the direction of Mother de Pazzi Meurer, the American Province of the Missionary Sisters of the Catholic Apostolate (Pallottines), acquired ownership of the property and took over the administration of the schools. As well-educated and experienced teachers, the Pallottine Sisters brought with them an innovative and professional character to the schools, which continues to this day. Within two years, expansion was necessary for the boarding house. Upon completion, the accommodations for boarders were increased from fourteen to fifty. In 1938 the co-educational Academy, under the principalship of Sister Bede Kurth, SAC, received accreditation from the State of Maryland. By that year enrollment had risen from 23 in 1934 to 179. In 1949 the Academy added two new classrooms, but by 1957 the school had outgrown itself again. The entire eighteenth century mansion was razed and construction of the present high school and day care building was begun. It was thought at that time that the new facility, with a capacity for about four hundred students and residence for thirty sisters, would end all of the space problems for the future. The new building also brought a change in the name from St. Mildred's Academy to Pallotti High School in honor of the founder of the Pallottines.

Notable alumni
 Keron DeShields, professional basketball player
 Kathleen Dumais, politician
 Jarrett Jack, NBA player
 Ovide Lamontagne, New Hampshire politician, former teacher
 Jaret Patterson, American football running back
 Marcquise Reed, professional basketball player
 Austen Rowland, professional basketball player
 Chase Young, American football defensive end

School colors and mascot
The school colors are navy blue, Columbia blue, white, and black. The Pallotti mascot is the Panther.

References

1921 establishments in Maryland
Buildings and structures in Laurel, Maryland
Catholic secondary schools in Maryland
Educational institutions established in 1921
Pallottines
Schools in Prince George's County, Maryland